Neel Kamal is a Hindi-Urdu term meaning "Blue Lotus". It may refer to:

 Neel Kamal (1947 film), a film directed by Kidar Sharma with debut roles by Raj Kapoor and Madhubala
 Neel Kamal (1968 film), a film directed by Ram Maheshwari starring Waheeda Rehman, Raaj Kumar  and Manoj Kumar